Conscientiousness is the personality trait of being careful, or diligent. Conscientiousness implies a desire to do a task well, and to take obligations to others seriously. Conscientious people tend to be efficient and organized as opposed to easy-going and disorderly. They exhibit a tendency to show self-discipline, act dutifully, and aim for achievement; they display planned rather than spontaneous behavior; and they are generally dependable. It is manifested in characteristic behaviors such as being neat, and systematic; also including such elements as carefulness, thoroughness, and deliberation (the tendency to think carefully before acting).

Conscientiousness is one of the five traits of both the Five Factor Model and the HEXACO model of personality and is an aspect of what has traditionally been referred to as having character. Conscientious individuals are generally hard-working, and reliable. When taken to an extreme, they may also be "workaholics", perfectionists, and compulsive in their behavior. People who score low on conscientiousness tend to be laid back, less goal-oriented, and less driven by success; they also are more likely to engage in antisocial and criminal behavior.

Personality models 
Conscientiousness is one of the five major dimensions in the Big Five model of personality (also called Five Factor Model or OCEAN), which consists of openness to experience, conscientiousness, extraversion, agreeableness, and neuroticism. Two of many personality tests that assess these traits are Costa and McCrae's NEO PI-R and Goldberg's NEO-IPIP. According to these models, conscientiousness is considered to be a continuous dimension of personality, rather than a categorical 'type' of person.

In the NEO framework, Conscientiousness is seen as having six facets: Competence, Order, Dutifulness, Achievement Striving, Self-Discipline, and Deliberation. Other models suggest a smaller set of two "aspects": orderliness and industriousness form an intermediate level of organization, with orderliness associated with the desire to keep things organized and tidy and industriousness being more associated with productivity and work ethic.

Other personality traits ((Low) extraversion, (high) agreeableness, (low) openness and (low) neuroticism) are linked to high conscientiousness along with impulse control. Behaviorally, low conscientiousness is associated with an inability to motivate one's self to perform tasks that the individual desires to accomplish.

Conscientiousness also appears in other models of personality, such as Cloninger's Temperament and Character Inventory, in which it is related to both self-directedness and persistence. It also includes the specific traits of rule consciousness and perfectionism in Cattell's 16 PF model. It is negatively associated with impulsive sensation-seeking in Zuckerman's alternative five model. Traits associated with conscientiousness are frequently assessed by self-report integrity tests given by various corporations to prospective employees.

Origin 
Terms such as 'hard-working,' 'reliable,' and 'persevering' describe desirable aspects of character. Because it was once believed to be a moral evaluation, conscientiousness was overlooked as a real psychological attribute. The reality of individual differences in conscientiousness has now been clearly established by studies of cross-observer agreement. Peer and expert ratings confirm the self-reports that people make about their degrees of conscientiousness. Furthermore, both self-reports and observer ratings of conscientiousness predict real-life outcomes such as academic success.

During most of the 20th century, psychologists believed that personality traits could be divided into two categories: temperament and character. Temperament traits were thought to be biologically based, whereas character traits were thought to be learned either during childhood or throughout life. With the advent of the FFM (Five-Factor Model), behavior geneticists began systematic studies of the full range of personality traits, and it soon became clear that all five factors are substantially heritable. Identical twins showed very similar personality traits even when they had been separated at birth and raised apart, and this was equally true for both character traits and temperament traits. Parents and communities influence the ways in which conscientiousness is expressed, but they apparently do not influence its level.

Measurement 
A person's level of conscientiousness is generally assessed using self-report measures, although peer-reports and third-party observation can also be used. Self-report measures are either lexical or based on statements. Deciding which measure of either type to use in research is determined by an assessment of psychometric properties and the time and space constraints of the study being undertaken.

Lexical 
Lexical measures use individual adjectives that reflect conscientiousness traits, such as efficient and systematic, and are very space and time efficient for research purposes. Goldberg (1992) developed a 20-word measure as part of his 100-word Big Five markers. Saucier (1994) developed a briefer 8-word measure as part of his 40-word mini-markers. Thompson (2008) systematically revised these measures to develop the International English Mini-Markers which has superior validity and reliability in populations both within and outside North America. Internal consistency reliability of the International English Mini-Markers for the Conscientiousness measure for native English-speakers is reported as .90, that for non-native English-speakers is .86.

Statement 
Statement measures tend to comprise more words than lexical measures, so hence consume more research instrument space and more respondent time to complete. Respondents are asked the extent to which they, for example, often forget to put things back in their proper place,  or are careful to avoid making mistakes. Some statement-based measures of conscientiousness have similarly acceptable psychometric properties in North American populations to lexical measures, but their generally emic development makes them less suited to use in other populations. For instance, statements in colloquial North American English like Often forget to put things back in their proper place or Am careful to avoid making mistakes can be hard for non-native English-speakers to understand, suggesting internationally validated measures might be more appropriate for research conducted with non-North Americans.

Behavior

Development 
Currently, little is known about conscientiousness in young children because the self-report inventories typically used to assess it are not appropriate for that age group. There are likely individual differences in this factor at an early age. It is known, for example, that some children have attention deficit/hyperactivity disorder, which is characterized in part by problems with concentration, organization, and persistence. Longitudinal and cross-sectional studies suggest that conscientiousness is relatively low among adolescents but increases between 18 and 30 years of age.  Research has also shown that conscientiousness generally increases with age from 21 to 60, though the rate of increase is slow.

Individual differences are also strongly preserved, meaning that a careful, neat, and scrupulous 30-year-old is likely to become a careful, neat, and scrupulous 80-year-old.

Daily life 
People who score high on the trait of conscientiousness tend to be more organized and less cluttered in their homes and offices. For example, their books tend to be neatly shelved in alphabetical order, or categorized by topic, rather than scattered around the room. Their clothes tend to be folded and arranged in drawers or closets instead of lying on the floor. The presence of planners and to-do lists are also signs of conscientiousness.  Their homes tend to have better lighting than the homes of people who score low on this trait. In a 2009 study, ten behaviors strongly associated with conscientiousness were scientifically categorized (the number at the end of each behavior is a correlation coefficient; a negative number means conscientious people were less likely to manifest the behavior):

Academic and workplace performance 
Conscientiousness is importantly related to successful academic performance in students and workplace performance among managers and workers. Low levels of conscientiousness are strongly associated with procrastination. A considerable amount of research indicates that conscientiousness has a moderate to large positive correlation with performance in the workplace, and indeed that after general mental ability is taken into account, the other four of the Big Five personality traits do not aid in predicting career success.

Conscientious employees are generally more reliable, more motivated, and harder working. They also have lower rates of absenteeism and counterproductive work behaviors such as stealing and fighting with other employees. Furthermore, conscientiousness is the personality trait that mostly correlates with performance across all categories of jobs.
Agreeableness and emotional stability may also be important, particularly in jobs that involve a significant amount of social interaction.
Of all manager/leader types, top executives show the lowest level of rule-following, a conscientious trait. Conscientiousness is not always positively related to job performance, sometimes the opposite is true. Being too conscientious could lead to taking too much time to making urgent decisions and to working too attached to the rules and lack innovation.

Subjective well-being 

A 2008 meta-analysis found that conscientiousness has a positive relationship with subjective well-being, particularly satisfaction with life, so highly conscientious people tend to be happier with their lives than those who score low on this trait.
Although conscientiousness is generally seen as a positive trait to possess, recent research has suggested that in some situations it may be harmful for well-being. In a prospective study of 9570 individuals over four years, highly conscientious people suffered more than twice as much if they became unemployed. The authors suggested this may be due to conscientious people making different attributions about why they became unemployed, or through experiencing stronger reactions following failure. This finding is consistent with perspectives which see no trait as inherently positive or negative, but rather the consequences of the trait being dependent on the situation and concomitant goals and motivations.

Problematic life outcomes 
Low conscientiousness has been linked to antisocial and criminal behaviors, as well as unemployment, homelessness, and imprisonment. Low conscientiousness and low agreeableness taken together are also associated with substance use disorders. People low in conscientiousness have difficulty saving money and have different borrowing practices than conscientious people. High conscientiousness is associated with more careful planning of shopping trips and less impulse buying of unneeded items. Conscientiousness has been found to be positively correlated with business and white-collar crime.

Health and longevity 

According to an 80-year old and ongoing study started in 1921 by psychologist Lewis Terman on over 1,500 gifted adolescent Californians, "The strongest predictor of long life was conscientiousness." Specific behaviors associated with low conscientiousness may explain its influence on longevity. Nine different behaviors that are among the leading causes of mortality—alcohol use, disordered eating (including obesity), drug use, lack of exercise, risky sexual behavior, risky driving, tobacco use, suicide, and violence—are all predicted by low conscientiousness. Health behaviors are more strongly correlated with the conventionality rather than the impulse-control aspect of conscientiousness. Apparently, social norms influence many health-relevant behavior, such as healthy diet and exercise, not smoking and moderate drinking, and highly conscientious people adhere the most strongly to these norms. Additionally, conscientiousness is positively related to health behaviors such as regular visits to a doctor, checking smoke alarms, and adherence to medication regimens. Such behavior may better safeguard health and prevent disease.

Relationships 
Relationship quality is positively associated with partners' level of conscientiousness, and highly conscientious people are less likely to get divorced. Conscientiousness is associated with lower rates of behavior associated with divorce, such as extramarital affairs, spousal abuse, and alcohol use disorder. Conscientious behaviors may have a direct influence on relationship quality, as people low in conscientiousness are less responsible, less responsive to their partners, are more condescending, and less likely to hold back offensive comments. On the other hand, more conscientious people are better at managing conflict and tend to provoke fewer disagreements, perhaps because they elicit less criticism due to their well-controlled and responsible behavior.

Intelligence 
Conscientiousness significantly correlated negatively with abstract reasoning (−0.26) and verbal reasoning (−0.23).

Large unselected studies have found null relationships. The negative relationship sometimes found in selected samples such as universities may be artificially created by the selection, from students who are low on one factor and high on the other (negative relationship) using the strong one to compensate and pass the selection, while students who are low on both (positive relationship) are removed by the selection. 

A large study found that fluid intelligence was significantly negatively correlated with the order (−0.15), self-discipline (−0.08), and deliberation (−0.09) subfactors of conscientiousness (all correlations significant with p < 0.001).

Political attitudes 
Conscientiousness is related to conservative political attitudes. 

Because conscientiousness is positively related to job performance,  conservative (vs. liberal) service workers have been shown to earn higher ratings, evaluations, and tips. 

Although right-wing authoritarianism is one of the most powerful predictors of prejudice, a large scale meta-analysis found that conscientiousness itself is uncorrelated with general prejudice. Rebellion against control is significantly negatively correlated with conscientiousness.

Conscientiousness is associated with rule compliance, obedience and integrity.

Creativity 
The orderliness/dependability subfactors (order, dutifulness, and deliberation) of conscientiousness correlate negatively with creativity while the industriousness/achievement subfactors correlate positively. Another study showed that people who score high on the order subfactor of conscientiousness show less innovative behavior. Group conscientiousness has a negative effect on group performance during creative tasks. Groups with only conscientious members have difficulty solving open-ended problems.

Adaptability 
A study from 2006 found that those scoring low on conscientiousness make better decisions after unanticipated changes in the context of a task. Specifically, the subfactors order, dutifulness, and deliberation negatively correlated with decision-making quality, but not competence, achievement striving, and self-discipline.

Religiosity 
General religiosity was mainly related to high Agreeableness and Conscientiousness of the Big Five traits.

Geography

United States 
Average levels of conscientiousness vary by state in the United States. People living in the central part, including the states of Kansas, Nebraska, Oklahoma, and Missouri, tend to have higher scores on average than people living in other regions. People in the southwestern states of New Mexico, Utah, and Arizona also have relatively high average scores on conscientiousness. Among the eastern states, Florida is the only one that scores in the top ten for this personality trait. The four states with the lowest scores on conscientiousness on average were, in descending order, Rhode Island, Hawaii, Maine, and Alaska.

Great Britain 
A large scale survey of residents of Great Britain found that average levels of all the Big Five, including conscientiousness, vary across regional districts in England, Wales and Scotland. High levels of conscientiousness were found throughout much of Southern England, scattered areas of the Midlands, and most of the Scottish Highlands. Low levels of conscientiousness were observed in London, Wales, and parts of the North of England. Higher mean levels of regional conscientiousness were positively correlated with voting for the Conservative Party, and negatively correlated with voting for the Labour Party, in the 2005 and 2010 elections, and also correlated with a higher proportion of married residents, with higher life expectancy for men and women, fewer long-term health problems, and with lower rates of mortality from stroke, cancer, and heart disease. Higher regional conscientiousness was also correlated with lower median annual income in 2011.

See also 
Personality psychology

References 

Personality traits